Gogol Bordello Non-Stop is a 2008 music documentary film, written and directed by Margarita Jimeno and starring Gogol Bordello and Eugene Hütz.

Synopsis
Chronicles the notorious live band Gogol Bordello and front man Eugene Hütz, a gypsy-punk Ukrainian immigrant.  Includes footage of raucous gigs from 2001 to 2007, as the band begins in dingy basement venues and eventually gains fame on international stages.

Critical response
“In Gogol Bordello Non-Stop Eugene Hutz emerges as a passionate, articulate philosopher of punk’s democratic participatory aesthetic who espouses the rejection of social hierarchies in concerts that are raucous, bacchanalian performance-art carnivals.” — Stephen Holden, The New York Times

New York Times Review
New York Post Review
Village Voice Review
IFC  Review

Awards

 2009:  BEST FILM AWARD MUSIXINE Finland

“Margarita managed to not only portray a band, but also the social aspects of being an immigrant and taking the responsibility to play with identities. Also the film is fresh, enjoyable and punk".  The Jury
The jury consisted of three members; Johannes Klein, the head of the Jury and the International Programming Coordinator of the In Edit International Music Documentary and Film Festival in Barcelona; Jouko Aaltonen, a Finnish director specialising in documentaries and Laura M. Kiralfy, a manager of Filmkontakt Nord Nordisk Forum for Co-Financing of Documentaries during Nordisk Panorama 5 Cities Film Festival.

 2008: AUDIENCE AWARD MOFFOM, Czech Republic
 2008: SOUND AND VISION AWARD, SPECIAL MENTION CPH:DOX Denmark

Film Festival Official Selection

2009
5th Ambulante, Mexico
7th Big Sky Documentary Film Festival, USA
16th Noise Pop Film Festival, USA
16th Titanic Film Festival, Hungary
14th Vilnius International Film Festival, Lithuania
Rockumentary Groove – revija rock dokumentaraca, Croatia
DORF Vinkovci, Croatia
40th Nashville Film Festival, USA
Sensoria, England
Doc Aviv, Israel
Big Rivers Film festival, The Netherlands
Musixine Competition, Oulu Finland
Raindance, London, England
Bergen International Film Festival, Bergen Norway
Easternxpress Film Festival, Uppsala, Sweden
Rolling Film Festival Pristina. Serbia
Shoot me, The Hague, The Netherlands
Rokumentti, Helsinki Finland
Molodist, Kiev Ukrania
Cinemania, Sofia Bulgaria
In-Edit, Santiago Chile

2008
31st Göteborg International Film Festival, Sweden
26th Filmfest München, Germany
35th Ghent International Film Festival, Belgium
22nd AFI Fest, USA
21st Helsinki International Film Festival, Finland
5th Music on Film Film on Music, Czech republic
5th CPH:DOX Copenhagen, Denmark
21st Exground Film Festival, Germany
European Social Forum Malmo, Sweden
International Film Festival Bratislava, Slovakia

External links

 
 Kino Lorber Official distributor
 
 
 Netflix instant watch

2008 films
American road movies
2000s road movies
2000s Russian-language films
American rock music films
2008 directorial debut films
2000s English-language films
2000s American films